Thomas Scott (1816–1892) was a notable New Zealand police officer, mail carrier, storekeeper, ferryman and hotel-keeper. He was born in Kilconquhar, Fife, Scotland in 1816.

References

1816 births
1892 deaths
People from Kilconquhar
New Zealand hoteliers
New Zealand police officers
Scottish emigrants to New Zealand
New Zealand traders